Space Opera Miniatures is a set of miniatures published by Fantasy Games Unlimited for Space Opera.

Contents
Space Opera Miniatures is a set of miniatures in 15 mm scale; each set includes 10 different 15 mm figures for use with Space Opera as player characters of NPCs.

Reception
William A. Barton reviewed Space Opera Miniatures in The Space Gamer No. 49. Barton commented that "Generally, the Space Opera Miniatures are well-cast and quite suitable for role-playing use, either with Space Opera or mixed (for variety) with figures from other lines for Traveller, Star Patrol, Universe, or any other SF RPG or miniature system."

Ian J. Knight reviewed Space Opera Figures for Imagine magazine, and stated that "The range is nicely detailed, especially about the aliens' faces, full of character, and chunky in the currently popular fashion. The casting is crisp and largely flash-free. It will stretch your painting abilities to do them justice, but the results will stand proudly alongside the best of the existing 15mm ranges."

References

See also
List of lines of miniatures

Miniature figures
Space Opera (role-playing game)